The Ries Brothers (pronounced "Rees") are a musical duo from Tampa, Florida, who blend rock, blues, funk, and reggae. Older brother Charlie sings lead vocals while playing drums and keyboard bass. Younger brother Kevin Jordan plays guitar, provides background vocals, and co-writes many of their songs.

Early career
The Beatles were a major influence in the development of Charlie Ries' interest in music. Charlie had been dreaming of becoming a professional baseball player, and his family had moved from Chicago, Illinois to Tampa, Florida for that reason. When he was 9-years-old, his father bought him a CD of the Beatle's Love album, after Charlie expressed interest in a poster connected with the show. The CD sparked his interest in music  and influence him.It  led him to take up piano, drums, and singing, which he can now play simultaneously. This self-taught technique was inspired by The Doors' Ray Manzarek. Charlie's other influences include Jack Johnson, John Mayer, and The Black Keys. 

Kevin was also influenced by The Beatles. During a family trip to Orlando, Florida when he was 9 years old, they visited the Hard Rock Café and took a memorabilia tour. In the John Lennon Room, he saw a video of Jimi Hendrix and one of his guitars. He decided that he wanted to play the guitar the way Jimi played too. Kevin prefers reggae-rock groups like Sublime and Rebelution. 

On display in their homes is a guitar signed by the Rolling Stones, a drumhead autographed by Aerosmith, a guitar autographed by Paul McCartney, and concert tags from their tours with Chicago and Daughtry. Their music is a blend of pop, jazz, blues, classic and alternative rock.

Their parents are not musicians. Kevin Ries Sr. is a day trader, and their mother Jenifer Ries is a photographer. Kevin Sr.'s father, however, was a vocalist and Jenifer's father played with the Jackson 5 and Sonny & Cher. Despite the previous generation's musical connections, their immediate family had none, so they accumulated contacts through a heavy touring schedule, playing over 300 shows in their first four years. The Ries Brothers attended a high school online to accommodate the demands of their musical careers. Their early gigs consisted of playing covers of their parent's favorite classic rock bands' songs at "Crabby Bill's on the Beach" in Clearwater, Florida. An employee of the band Chicago heard them at one of those shows, establishing their connections to the band. The family coordinates almost all of their own booking and publicity. While interviewing potential management companies, they were taken aback when they heard their original songs altered and abbreviated by one company.

Recent work
In 2018, they completed a 27 city tour in support of G. Love & Special Sauce. The same year, they appeared at the Gasparilla Music Festival in Tampa, Florida, SunFest in West Palm Beach, Florida, and the California Roots Music and Arts Festival in Monterey, California. They have twice toured nationally as the opening act for the iconic band CHICAGO and did a 15 city tour opening for the late Butch Trucks (Allman Brothers) & The Freight Train Band. The brothers recently headlined their second show at "The House that Les Paul Built", the legendary Iridium Jazz Club in New York City, with special guests Byron Isaacs of The Lumineers and Vini "Mad Dog" Lopez, founding member of the E Street Band and member of the Rock & Roll Hall of Fame. The Ries Brothers have also opened for David Cook, Daughtry, Los Lonely Boys, REO Speedwagon, Little River Band, The Edgar Winter Band & The Family Stone among others. They have sold out three headlining shows at Ruth Eckerd Hall's Murray Theatre in Clearwater, Florida. In the summer of 2013, the boys participated in the exclusive Los Angeles Grammy Museum's Music Revolution Project at Ruth Eckerd Hall. In the summer of 2014, the boys were a part of the Van's Warped Tour in Florida. The Ries Brothers were named by The Tampa Bay Times as one of their favorite artists of 2015 and by Creative Loafing as a 2016 "Breakout Artist". They have released three EP's and a Live Concert DVD. Their first full album The View From The Outside, produced by Ted Bowne of Passafire, was released on November 10, 2017.

Personnel
 Charlie Ries (lead vocals, drums, and keyboard bass)
 Kevin Ries (background vocals and guitar)

Discography
Live in Clearwater, FL (2015)
The View From The Outside (2017)

References

External links
 
 Fox 13 Tampa Bay's Story on The Ries Brothers
Social media
 
 
 
 

Alternative rock groups from Florida
American pop rock music groups
Sibling musical duos
American musical duos
Rock music duos
Musical groups established in 2005
2005 establishments in Florida
Clearwater, Florida